The Colombian Battalion was an infantry battalion of the Colombian Army that served under United Nations Command during the Korean War from 1951 to 1954. The first Colombian military unit to serve in Asia, the battalion was attached to the U.S. 7th Infantry Division and 25th Infantry Divisions.

Background 
The election of President Laureano Gómez in 1950 sparked renewed interest in building up Colombia–United States relations. Gómez wanted greater U.S. economic support in exchange for direct involvement as an ally, and a means to erase any lingering impressions caused among U.S. policy makers of his previous attitude of anti–U.S. and pro–German sentiment during the World Wars.

Gómez emphasized the importance of the United Nations security charter and the concept of collective security. As such, he pushed the military to form an expeditionary force that could be deployed on behalf of the United Nations.

Korean War 
Following the outbreak of the Korean War, the Colombian Battalion was deployed to Busan on 15 June 1951 under the command of Colonel Jaime Polanía Puyo. The battalion participated in Operation Thunderbolt, the Battle of Old Baldy, the Battle of Triangle Hill and the recapture of Kumsong (:ko:금성군 (강원도)). The Battle of Old Baldy was particularly notable for the battalion, as the unit lost (killed or wounded) 20% of its deployed strength  in the engagement.

Casualties 
The Colombian Battalion suffered men 163 killed in action, 448 wounded, 60 missing, and 30 captured over the course of the conflict.

Gallery

References 

1951 establishments in Colombia
Military units and formations established in 1951
Military units and formations disestablished in 1954
Military units and formations of Colombia in the Korean War
Battalions of the Korean War